Dolichoderus crawleyi is a species of ant in the genus Dolichoderus. Described by Donisthorpe in 1917, the species is endemic to Singapore.

References

Dolichoderus
Hymenoptera of Asia
Insects of Singapore
Insects described in 1917